Ernobius is a genus of beetles in the family Ptinidae. There are about 90 species. Most occur in North America, Europe, and North Africa.

Species
These 66 species belong to the genus Ernobius:

 Ernobius abietinus (Gyllenhal, 1808) g
 Ernobius abietis (Fabricius, 1792) g
 Ernobius alutaceus (LeConte, 1861) i c g
 Ernobius angelinii Lohse, 1991 g
 Ernobius angusticollis (Ratzeburg, 1847) g
 Ernobius benedikti
 Ernobius besucheti Zahradnik, 2000 g
 Ernobius bicolor White, 1983 i c g
 Ernobius californicus Fisher, 1919 i c g
 Ernobius caudatus Van Dyke, 1923 i c g
 Ernobius collaris Fall, 1905 i c g
 Ernobius conicola Fisher, 1919 i c g
 Ernobius convergens Fall, 1905 i c g
 Ernobius crotchii Fall, 1905 i c g
 Ernobius cupressi Chobaut, 1899 g
 Ernobius cyprogenius
 Ernobius debilis LeConte, 1865 i c g
 Ernobius explanatus (Mannerheim, 1843) g
 Ernobius filicornis LeConte, 1879 i c g
 Ernobius fissuratus Fall, 1905 i c g
 Ernobius freudei Lohse, 1970 g
 Ernobius fulvus C.Johnson, 1975 g
 Ernobius gallicus C.Johnson, 1975 g
 Ernobius gentilis Fall, 1905 i c g
 Ernobius gigas (Mulsant & Rey, 1863) g
 Ernobius gracilis LeConte, 1879 i c g
 Ernobius granulatus LeConte, 1865 i c g b
 Ernobius hirsutus White, 1966 i c g
 Ernobius impressithorax Pic, 1902 g
 Ernobius jaroslavli Logvinovskiy, 1977 g
 Ernobius juniperi Chobaut, 1899 g
 Ernobius kailidisi Johnson, 1975 g
 Ernobius kiesenwetteri Schilsky, 1898 g
 Ernobius lacustris Fall, 1905 i c g
 Ernobius laticollis Pic, 1927 g
 Ernobius longicornis (Sturm, 1837) g
 Ernobius lucidus (Mulsant & Rey, 1863) g
 Ernobius luteipennis LeConte, 1879 i c g
 Ernobius madoni Pic, 1930 g
 Ernobius melanoventris Ruckes, 1957 i c g
 Ernobius mollis (Linnaeus, 1758) i c g b (pine bark anobiid)
 Ernobius montanus Fall, 1905 i c g
 Ernobius mulsanti Kiesenwetter, 1877 g
 Ernobius nigrans Fall, 1905 i c g
 Ernobius nigrinus (Sturm, 1837) g
 Ernobius oculeus Toskina, 2002 g
 Ernobius oertzeni Schilsky, 1900 g
 Ernobius opicus Fall, 1905 i c g
 Ernobius pallidipennis Pic, 1902 g
 Ernobius pallitarsis Fall, 1905 i c g
 Ernobius parens (Mulsant & Rey, 1863) g
 Ernobius parvus White, 1966 i c g
 Ernobius pini (Sturm, 1837) g
 Ernobius pinicola Ruckes, 1957 i c g
 Ernobius pruinosus (Mulsant & Rey, 1863) g
 Ernobius punctulatus (LeConte, 1859) i c g
 Ernobius reflexus (Mulsant & Rey, 1863) g
 Ernobius robusticornis Maran, 1941 g
 Ernobius rufus (Illiger, 1807) g
 Ernobius schedli Brown, 1932 i c g
 Ernobius socialis Fall, 1905 i c g
 Ernobius subopacus Pic, 1904 g
 Ernobius tenuicornis LeConte, 1865 i c g
 Ernobius tristis LeConte, 1879 i c g
 Ernobius vinolasi Novoa & Baselga, 2000 g
 Ernobius youngi

Data sources: i = ITIS, c = Catalogue of Life, g = GBIF, b = Bugguide.net

References

External links

 

Ptinidae
Bostrichiformia genera